Elstow is a village and civil parish in the Borough of Bedford, Bedfordshire, England, about  south of Bedford town centre.

John Bunyan was born here at Bunyan's End, which lay approximately halfway between the hamlet of Harrowden and Elstow's High Street.

History
Countess Judith, niece of William the Conqueror, founded a Benedictine nunnery in Elstow in the year 1078. The Elstow nuns came from wealthy families, and each came with an endowment of money and/or lands.

In 1538 Elstow Abbey was valued as being the eighth richest nunnery in England.  On 26 August 1539, the Abbess was forced to surrender the Abbey, the manor of Elstow and all the Abbey's other lands and estates throughout England, to King Henry VIII, as part of his Dissolution of the Monasteries.

So large and significant was the Abbey at Elstow that, a vote was carried in Parliament to create a cathedral for Bedfordshire using the now available site. But this motion never received the royal assent hoped for by its sponsor, Bishop Stephen Gardiner of Winchester.

South of the village, from 1942 to 1946 during World War II, the munitions factory ROF Elstow operated. Author H.E. Bates wrote about it in The Tinkers of Elstow (1946).

Elstow today 
The village and most of the populated part of Elstow parish are located inside Bedford's southern bypass, with the hamlet of Harrowden lying just to the south-east of that road.  
Elstow is now, effectively, a suburb of Bedford, and the old village is nearly surrounded by 20th-century housing.  But the original village – now a conservation area – remains intact, with some 13th-  17th-century buildings and a village green.

Primary education is provided by Elstow School, with around 350 pupils on roll.

Moot Hall – the Green House 

Moot Hall (or "The Green House") stands in isolation on Elstow village green. This Tudor timber-framed building was built in the 15th century, possibly by the Abbey's carpenter William Arnold, to provide both a courtroom and a market house.

When first constructed, the timber frame would have been in-filled with wattle and daub, rather than brick. The original building had only four bays on the ground floor, the three westernmost each containing two small shops.

Each shop had a separate door with a broad window, with a four-centred arch above. These windows may have had a hinged wooden panel that could be let down into the window opening and used as a serving counter. Parts of the partitions between the shops remain; slots in the ceiling and floor beams show where the other vertical timbers once stood.

The fourth bay contained a separate room, probably with an entrance door at the southern end of the east wall. The hall on the upper storey was, at some point, divided into three rooms (possibly forming a robing room, a courtroom and a waiting room) but it is uncertain whether this was part of the original design or a later alteration.

Sometime after the original construction, a fifth bay was added to the east end, including a large chimney breast. This contains fireplaces on both storeys, suggesting that it was designed as accommodation for high-status visitors to the wealthy nunnery. Probably at the same time, the window in western wall was moved to a higher position; a cellar was excavated under the fourth bay; a north–south staircase was erected; an Elizabethan doorway (now removed) was inserted into the north wall where the easternmost shop stood; and the external wattle and daub in-fill was replaced with bricks.

During renovations in 1950, the building was restored to its original Medieval form and the window in the western wall moved back down, but the external walls' brick in-fill was retained. The timbers of the Medieval roof were also left intact, with new rafters being laid over the originals. Similar late-medieval market houses, with a long chamber on the upper floor, are rare. Two others survive in Buckinghamshire, at Long Crendon and West Wycombe, and a similar, but later, example is to be found in Leighton Buzzard, Bedfordshire. However, Moot Hall is thought be unique, being the only known example of a market house, built by a nunnery, that combines a courtroom and market centre.

For many years, it was thought that the downstairs shop bays were only used for storing stalls and other equipment in connection with the Abbey's bi-annual fairs. However, investigations carried out in the 1990s into the building's method of construction indicated that the six shop bays were probably permanent shops, used throughout the whole year.

The Abbesses of Elstow held the title of lord of the manor and acted as local magistrates. They needed a courtroom, which, in the case of Moot Hall, was located in the main upper room. In addition to being used as a manorial court, it would have been used as a Court of Piepowders for the settling of disputes arising during the Abbey's (and, after 1539, Elstow village's) large, four-day, May fairs.

This upper room was probably also used through most of its history as a village meeting place, hence its present name ('Moot Hall' being the medieval term for a meeting place). Some early records refer to it as the Green House. Whether it was also known in early times as Moot Hall is not known. The earliest known recorded instance of it being referred to as such is in Reverend John Brown's biography of John Bunyan, in which he refers to it as 'what we may call Moot Hall'.

Two years after The Suppression of Religious Houses Act 1539, Elstow Green and the Abbey were leased to Edmund Harvey (or Hervey), who was great-nephew of Elizabeth Hervey, Abbess of Elstow from 1501–1522.

Harvey's daughter Isabel married Sir Humphrey Radcliffe. In 1553, Edmund Harvey died and Edward VI granted the former Abbey's estate, with all its manorial rights, to Radcliffe, who moved to live in Elstow. He was Sherrif of Beds & Bucks 1558–9 and steward of Elstow from 1563 until his death in 1566.
 

In 1616, Radcliffe's son Edward sold the Elstow estate to Sir Thomas Hillersden, whose grandson (also named Thomas) left £100 in his will so that his wife could convert part of the cloister building into a grand manor house. This was subsequently named Elstow Place. This magnificent building, its porch possibly designed by Inigo Jones, would have been seen every time the young John Bunyan walked into Elstow village. It may have been the original inspiration for his 'House Beautiful' in The Pilgrim's Progress.

Fairs continued to be held at Elstow throughout this period, though on a smaller scale, and Moot Hall continued to be used for court hearings.  In 1554, Thomas Bonyon (John Bunyan's great-great-grandfather) was a member of the "homage" (the Manor Court's presiding jury) when his wife was fined 1 penny for 'breaking the assize of ale'.  (Mrs Bonyon also appears on subsequent manor court rolls for committing further offences involving the sale of ale or bread.) Moot Hall continued to be used for court hearings until the magistrates' court system was established in the 19th century. At that time, a courthouse was built in Bedford.

By 1773, the Hillersden family consisted of two sisters. With dwindling finances, they leased Moot Hall, its equipment, and fair tolls to Thomas Coleman. During the 1790s, the Hillersden sisters moved out of Elstow Place into the smaller Elstow Lodge. The mansion was left to fall into ruin. Gradually the sisters sold, parcel by parcel, the rest of their Elstow estate to Samuel Whitbread.  
 
The 1800 Enclosure Act allotted Elstow Green to Whitbread and, with it, the ancient right to hold fairs and exact tolls and rents on stallholders. Whitbread subsequently purchased further properties in Elstow, until he owned most of the village. (Hence the present-day numbers that appear on some houses in Elstow's High Street, Wilstead Road, and West End are Whitbread (Southill) Estate, not street, numbers.)

In 1812, the Whitbread Estate leased Moot Hall to the Elstow Congregation of the Bunyan Meeting Free Church. For most of the rest of the 19th century, they used Moot Hall as a National and a Night school, with the Bunyan congregation holding Sunday evening services of worship in the former courtroom. They regularly attracted larger congregations than the nearby Abbey Church.

Schooling for children continued in Moot Hall until 1873 when, anticipating the Elementary Education Act 1880, a purpose-built school was constructed at the northern end of Elstow High Street. The Bunyan congregation continued to hold their services in Moot Hall until 1910. That year they too moved to the High Street, into a newly constructed chapel, next to the new school.

Fairs continued to be held on Elstow Green until the 20th century. Sales of cattle ceased during the First World War and, from then on, only a small pleasure fair continued. That was suspended during the Second World War. May Festivals have, however, continued to be held on Elstow green.  The stump of the original Medieval market cross – which denoted the Elstow Abbey Fair's Royal Charter status – still stands on Elstow Green, some 50 yards west of Moot Hall.

In 1950, Major Simon Whitbread gave Moot Hall and Elstow Green to Bedfordshire County Council, which restored the building to its original medieval form, as their contribution to the Festival of Britain. A year later, Moot Hall opened as a permanent museum.  It is now owned and cared for by Bedford Borough Council, which continues to operate it as a museum illustrating 17th-century English life, with exhibitions of antique furniture and information relating to John Bunyan.

May Festivals

Celebrating May Day pre-dates Christianity and probably originated as a pagan festival, a fertility rite, performed to ensure a good harvest, as well a providing an opportunity for a bit of spring-time jollity.  Each year, a "May Queen" would be chosen and crowned and then the celebrants would dance around a maypole. At night, bonfires would be lit. The maypole had a crown at the top, with streamers or ribbons hanging from just below. Pairs of boys and girls (or men and women) stood, alternately, around the base of the pole, each holding the end of a ribbon. When the music started, they would weave in and around each other, boys going one way, girls going the other, until the ribbons were woven together tightly around the pole and the merrymakers all met at its base. The phallic symbolism of the maypole and the nature of some of the dances, have, throughout history, rarely been openly acknowledged, but are obvious. The movement of the ribbons around the pole, as the dances took place, are also said to represent the motion of the sun.

Although the Catholic Church attempted to ban most of the rites associated with this May holiday, Rogation processions often incorporated elements from those festivities, in an attempt to supplant their pagan origin. These ceremonies, however, had exactly the same goals: the offering of prayers for good crops (not to mention, the chance for young men and women to meet).

No one knows for how long Elstow has held May Day festivals but there were certainly ‘fairs’ held here, at the beginning of May during the days of the Elstow Abbey (1078–1539), which held a charter to hold markets here. The Abbey's fairs were large, commercial affairs, covering all the fields around the Abbey, and they would have attracted many traders and shoppers from all the surrounding counties.  Whether there was maypole dancing during the days of the Abbey is unknown. The rise of Protestantism in the 16th century led to increasing disapproval of maypoles and other May Day practices, because Protestants viewed them as idolatry and therefore as immoral. When the puritan government banned maypoles in 1652, Elstow was one of the places that chose to ignore the ban.

In about 1889, Elstow May Day celebrations appear to have lapsed for some thirty years – until 1925, when the headmaster of Elstow School, Mr R.A.J. ('Bob') Wadsworth, re-established the festival. In that year, the event attracted a crowd of over 1,000 people.  The chief organiser of the dancing was Miss Dorothy Pestell, the school's music teacher. The dances were so popular that the school was often invited to take their pupils to perform at other locations.

Elstow's school's May Festival was performed on the first Thursday in May, at 3pm for the benefit of retired people and housewives, and again at 6pm for those who had been at work or school during the day. Each year, the May Queen was selected by the girls in the school's top year. They were not always Elstow village girls, as the school also served the Cosmic Avenue and Ampthill Road areas of Bedford, as well as the villages of Cople, Cotton End, Haynes, Harrowden, Willington and Wilstead. In the days leading up to the Festival, the children and their parents were all involved in the preparations: making flowers out of red, white and blue crepe paper and fixing them onto twigs and boughs.

On festival day, Elstow's High Street (at that time the A6 highway) was closed to traffic, so that the children could process safely from the school to the green. The maypole was carried all the way by six of the oldest and strongest boys. A coach, decorated all over with crepe flowers, carried the May Queen, two train bearers and the coachman/herald, who was dressed in riding boots, top hat and a red tunic. Again, it was the school's oldest boys who provided the ‘horsepower’ to pull the coach and its passengers. The May Queen's Maids of Honour, the Jester, and the remainder of the school's children, all walked behind the coach, each carrying a colourful decorated bough.

On arrival at the green, the pupils would enter an arena surrounded by hundreds of spectators.  The bearers would take the maypole to a pre-prepared spot, move it to an almost upright position, then slide it into a tube set into the ground. The children seated themselves in circles around the maypole and stuck their flower-covered boughs into the ground, symbolising the springing up and flowering of May blossoms. The Herald would make a short speech, introducing the May queen and announcing that she would now process to her coronation. Preceded by her Crown bearer (carrying the specially made crown on a red cushion), the May Queen would descend from her coach and, her train held up by her two trainbearers (a small boy and girl), process to her throne, set beside the maypole.  Once enthroned, she would be crowned by the previous year's May Queen.  The new queen made a speech, welcoming the people present, and requested “messengers of peace” – the signal for four boys to release four ‘doves’ from two cane baskets. The ‘doves’ were white homing pigeons. It was expected that the birds released during the afternoon performance would return to their roost, ready for another flight in the evening (but Bill Wagstaff always kept a few ‘spare’ birds in reserve!)

After the coronation, the children performed a variety of dances around the May Pole, so that their coloured ribbons created different, often intricate, decorative patterns – either radiating out from the crown at the top, or tightly wound around the pole itself.  Practically all the School's pupils would take part in the event – if not in the dances, carrying out tasks like selling programmes. Usually, one or two boys would be dressed up as jesters and would lark about throughout the proceedings, to make the audience laugh. At the end of the dancing, members of staff or soldiers would take open blankets around the crowd of spectators, who would throw in coins.  During wartime, the money collected was given to military charities; in later years, it was given to the school fund.

The fame of Elstow's May Festival spread rapidly, attracting considerable interest from local newspapers and photographers.  In 1932, it was reported that ‘crowds of people came from all parts of the county’. In 1935, all ten of the former May Queens were present at the opening ceremony.

Elstow May Festival continued even through the years of World War II and, in 1945, celebrated its ‘coming of age’ in the presence of its ‘first’ (i.e. from 1925) May Queen, Laura Caves.  In 1948, headmaster Bob Wadsworth retired but the festival continued. By 1952 it was attracting a combined audience (across the two performances) of ten to twelve thousand people. Moot Hall's museum holds a substantial collection of photographs, from the 1920s onward, and these can be viewed on request or on-line in the Elstow Picture Archive (see 'External Links', below).

In 1968, Bedfordshire changed from the Primary/Secondary system to Lower/Middle and Upper schools, and Elstow Primary School lost its three top years. Officials believed that, without the older pupils, they would be unable to stage the event. The festival was suspended for 5 years.

In 1974, the festival was re-introduced by Elstow Lower School, albeit on a much smaller scale. Only young children, aged up to 9, participated in using a much smaller maypole on the school's playing field, rather than on the green. The school ran this festival until 2000, when curriculum pressures forced them to stop.

The Festival was revived in 2006 by the Reverend Jeremy Crocker, rector of Elstow Abbey. Rather than burden the school with having to organise everything, various people from the church and village became involved. The present-day May festival is different from Bob Wadsworth's production, in that there is a funfair, a fete and performances by various guest musical, cheerleading and dancing groups.

It is likely much closer now in its character to those May Fairs that inspired John Bunyan's ‘Vanity Fayre’ in The Pilgrim’s Progress. The festival still includes the old coach conveying the May Queen in procession from the former school buildings, down High Street to Elstow green.  Children from Elstow Lower school carry out a few maypole dances but there are far fewer children involved than in the 20th century. There are no jesters, heralds, ‘doves’ or decorated boughs.  However, this event still provides an opportunity, as it has done – possibly for millennia – for the people of Elstow to come together, celebrate spring and to have fun.

References

External links 
 
 Elstow Village website
 
 Elstow picture archive
 Moot Hall Elstow, a Museum specialising in 17th century life and John Bunyan
 Bunyan's Bedford - places in and around Bedford linked to John Bunyan

Villages in Bedfordshire
Civil parishes in Bedfordshire
Borough of Bedford